The American Defender Classic was a golf tournament on the LPGA Tour from 1966 to 1981. It was played in Raleigh, North Carolina at the Raleigh Country Club from 1966 to 1974 and at the North Ridge Country Club from 1975 to 1981. The tournament was the LPGA's first tournament in North Carolina. In 1975, purse was $5,700.

Winners
American Defender/WRAL Golf Classic
1981 Donna Caponi

American Defender/WRAL Classic
1980 Amy Alcott

American Defender Classic
1978 Amy Alcott
1977 Kathy Whitworth
1976 Sue Roberts
1975 JoAnne Carner

American Defender-Raleigh Classic
1974 Jo Ann Prentice
1973 Judy Rankin

Raleigh Golf Classic
1972 Kathy Whitworth
1971 Kathy Whitworth

Raleigh Ladies Invitational
1970 Sandra Haynie
1969 Carol Mann
1968 Carol Mann
1967 Kathy Whitworth
1966 Carol Mann

References

Former LPGA Tour events
Recurring sporting events established in 1966
Recurring sporting events disestablished in 1981
Golf in North Carolina
Sports in Raleigh, North Carolina
1966 establishments in North Carolina
1981 disestablishments in North Carolina
Women's sports in North Carolina